Stanko Mršić (born 12 September 1955) is a Croatian professional football manager and former player.

Managerial career
Mršić began his managerial career at Cibalia in 1993 and since then he also has managed other 1. HNL clubs, among them Zadar, Varteks, Šibenik, Osijek and Međimurje. He holds the record for most managed matches in 1. HNL history with over 300 games. He managed in 482 Croatian footbal league matches in total over the different divisions.

On 12 March 2019, he was named the new manager of back then still Bosnian Premier League club GOŠK Gabela. After GOŠK got relegated to the First League of FBiH, Mršić decided to leave the club.

Honours

Manager
Varteks 
Croatian Cup runner-up: 1997–98

Posušje
First League of Herzeg-Bosnia: 1998–99

References

External links
 
article
article
photo 1987/88
photo 1986/87

1955 births
Living people
Sportspeople from Imotski
Association football defenders
Yugoslav footballers
RNK Split players
NK Solin players
HNK Cibalia players
FK Rudar Prijedor players
Yugoslav First League players
Croatian football managers
HNK Cibalia managers
NK Zadar managers
NK Varaždin managers
HŠK Posušje managers
HNK Šibenik managers
NK Osijek managers
NK Međimurje managers
NK Istra 1961 managers
NK Imotski managers
RNK Split managers
NK Vinogradar managers
NK GOŠK Gabela managers
Croatian Football League managers
Premier League of Bosnia and Herzegovina managers
Croatian expatriate football managers
Expatriate football managers in Bosnia and Herzegovina
Croatian expatriate sportspeople in Bosnia and Herzegovina